The 1936 Nobel Prize in Literature was awarded to the American playwright Eugene O'Neill "for the power, honesty and deep-felt emotions of his dramatic works, which embody an original concept of tragedy". The prize was awarded in 1937. He is the second American to become a literature laureate after Sinclair Lewis in 1930.

Laureate

Influenced by the realist playwrights Chekhov, Strindberg and Ibsen, Eugene O'Neill is regarded as the foremost American dramatist of the 20th century. His plays were among the first to include speeches in American English vernacular and involve characters on the fringes of society who struggle to maintain their hopes and aspirations, but ultimately slide into disillusion and despair. He was awarded the Pulitzer Prize three times, first for Beyond the Horizon (1920), his debut play, followed by Anna Christie in 1922 and Strange Interlude in 1928. Mourning Becomes Electra (1931) and the posthumous Long Day's Journey into Night is regarded as two masterpieces in a long string of plays.

Deliberations

Nominations
Eugene O'Neill was nominated for the prize three times, in 1934, 1935, and 1936.
In 1936 the Nobel committee received 47 nominations for 27 individuals including Paul Valéry, António Correia de Oliveira, Miguel Unamuno, Kostis Palamas, Olav Duun, Jarl Hemmer, Karel Capek, Benedetto Croce, Roger Martin du Gard (awarded in 1937) and Johannes V. Jensen (awarded in 1944). Ten were newly nominated such as Georges Duhamel, Ludwig Klages, Sigmund Freud, Cécile Tormay, Enrica von Handel-Mazzetti and Arvid Mörne. Most nominations were submitted for the Finnish author Frans Emil Sillanpää (awarded in 1939) with five nominations, including two nominations suggesting a shared prize with Jarl Hemmer and Arvid Mörne respectively. Only two women were nominated namely Cécile Tormay Tormay and Enrica von Handel-Mazzetti.

The authors Juliette Adam, Jacques Bainville, Mateiu Caragiale, James Churchward, Eugène Dabit, Adolf de Herz, Teresa de la Parra, Ramón del Valle-Inclán, Stefan Grabiński, Federico García Lorca, A. E. Housman, M. R. James, Kitty Lee Jenner, Dezső Kosztolányi, Mikhail Kuzmin, Mourning Dove, Elizabeth Robins Pennell, Kristína Royová, Jan Jacob Slauerhoff, Oswald Spengler, Dhanpat Rai Srivastava (known as Premchand), Ferdinand Tönnies, Lidia Veselitskaya and Zhou Shuren (known as Lu Xun) died in 1936 without having been nominated for the prize.

Prize decision
During the selection process in 1936, the Nobel Committee decided that none of the year's nominations met the criteria as outlined in the will of Alfred Nobel. According to the Nobel Foundation's statutes, the Nobel Prize can in such a case be reserved until the following year, and this statute was then applied, and the 1936 Nobel Prize in Literature was awarded the following year.

Banquet speech
Because of the state of his health, Eugene O'Neill was unable to travel to Stockholm to receive the prize. But he delivered a speech that was read by the American chargé d'affaires at the banquet in Stockholm City Hall. In the speech, O'Neill paid tribute to the Swedish dramatist August Strindberg and the great influence Strindberg had on his work.

Notes

References

External links
Award ceremony speech by Per Hallström
Banquet speech by Eugene O'Neill

1936